Henry's or Henrys may refer to:

Henry's (clothiers), a Wichita, Kansas company and AAU powerhouse
Henry's Dream, a Nick Cave and the Bad Seeds album
Henry's (electronics retailer), Canada
Henry (unit), the SI derived unit of electrical inductance
Henry's Beer, Wine & Spirits, a New Zealand liquor store chain
Henrys Lake, Idaho
Henry's Lake National Forest, Idaho
Paul Prosper Henrys, French general

See also
Henry's Amazing Animals, a Disney Channel children's program
Henry's Amazing Golden Gecko Awards
Henry's Anger, a Canberra heavy metal band
Henry's Cat, an animated children's television show
Henry's Dress, a rock band from New Mexico
Henry's Farmers Market (formerly Boney's Market), a Southern California retailer
Henrys Fork (Snake River)
Henry's Fork Caldera, a caldera in Yellowstone National Park
Henry's Grove, Berlin, Worcester County, Maryland
Henry's Hamburgers, an American restaurant chain
Henry's House, a London public relations firm
Henry's Knob, a superfund site in South Carolina
Henry's law, a gas law in chemistry
Sir Henry's, a nightclub in Cork, Ireland
St. Henry's Church (Bayonne, New Jersey)
Henry (disambiguation)